The city of St. Louis, Missouri, and metropolitan area includes the largest Bosnian American population and largest Bosnian population outside of Europe. The highest concentration of Bosnians in St. Louis is in the "Little Bosnia" neighborhood of Bevo Mill. The Bosnian cultural imprint can be seen in the numerous Bosnian restaurants, bakeries, and cafes, as well as several Bosnian mosques and religious organizations.

History

The first wave of Bosnians arrived in the 1990s, refugees of the Bosnian War. According to the refugee organization International Institute of St. Louis, the metropolitan area had about 70,000 people of Bosnian origins circa the late 1990s and early 2000s, the highest recorded number as of date.

On September 29, 2013, the Bosnian community donated a replica of Sebilj (kiosk-shaped public fountain) to the city of St. Louis for its 250th birthday. It was modeled after the famous 18th century one in Sarajevo, to mark the center of their community.

In 2014, a Bosniak-American named Zamir Begic was beaten to death with hammers. The murder caused shock in the Bosnian community of St. Louis and protests were held against violent crime. Because Begic was white and his suspected assailants were black and Latino, some claimed that the murder of Begic was an example of "black-on-white" crime while others claimed it was a "a targeted attack on Bosnians". While the belief that Begic was targeted due to his ethnicity or race contributed to racial tensions between the Black community and white Muslims of Bosnian descent, St. Louis police did not believe the attack had any ethnic or racial basis.

By 2019, according to the International Institute of St. Louis, the number of people of Bosnian ancestry in the metropolitan area had declined to 50,000, with an outflow of ethnic Bosnians from the St. Louis city limits and with some going to other states. A decline in the St. Louis economy and criminal activity were factors behind ethnic Bosnians leaving the city.

Demographics
As of 2013 there were 70,000 Bosnians in St. Louis. This is the largest population of Bosnians in the United States and the largest Bosnian population outside of Europe. Most are Bosniak and practice Islam, but a minority practice other religions including Roman Catholicism and Eastern Orthodoxy.

 the highest concentrations of Bosnians are in the neighborhood of Bevo Mill.

See also

Bevo Mill, St. Louis
St. Louis Islamic Center

References

Further reading
 Moore, Doug. "Bosnians in St. Louis area mark a time of trouble " (Archive). St. Louis Post-Dispatch. April 6, 2012.
 Sanchez, Margaux Wexberg. "Bosnians in St. Louis: Reflection 20 years after start of war." St. Louis Beacon. Friday April 6, 2012.
 Schuessler, Ryan. "Yugoslavia’s children, grown up in St. Louis" (Archive). Al Jazeera America. February 22, 2012.

External links
 St. Louis Bosnian history/archive project

Bosniak diaspora
Bosnian-American culture in Missouri
Bosnian-American history
Croatian-American history
Ethnic groups in St. Louis
Islam in Missouri